Yankee Small College Conference is a Division II conference in the United States Collegiate Athletic Association (USCAA). The conference consists of two-year and four-year schools from Maine, New Hampshire, Vermont, and New York State. The conference hosted its first championships in the 2008–09 season, and in 2011, the conference expanded to include Hampshire College and four new members from the disbanded Sunrise Athletic Conference of the National Association of Intercollegiate Athletics (NAIA).

Member schools

Current members

Notes

Affiliate members

Notes

Former members

Notes

Conference sports

See also 
Hudson Valley Intercollegiate Athletic Conference
Penn State University Athletic Conference

References

External links
The official YSCC website
The official USCAA website

 College sports conferences in the United States
 United States Collegiate Athletic Association
 College sports in New York (state)